Senator Tazewell may refer to:

Henry Tazewell (1753–1799), U.S. Senator from Virginia
Littleton Waller Tazewell (1774–1860), U.S. Senator from Virginia